Benjamin Russell may refer to:

Benjamin Russell (artist) (1804–1885), American artist
Benjamin Russell (journalist) (1761–1845), American, originator of expression Era of Good Feeling
Benjamin Russell (Canadian politician) (1849–1935), Canadian Liberal politician

Benjamin E. Russell (1845–1909), U.S. Representative from Georgia
Ben Russell (filmmaker) (born 1976), American experimental filmmaker
Ben Russell (rugby union, born 1983), English rugby player
Ben Russell (rugby union, born 1984), English rugby player